Sharatchandra Lohithaswa (born 5 May 1972), known popularly as Sharath Lohithaswa, is an Indian actor mostly known for his work in Kannada and Tamil films. He has had a successful career in theatre, where he continues to work, and television. After working as a lecturer for a brief period, Sharath took to acting as a full-time profession and worked on stage following the footsteps of his father Lohithaswa. He began working in films in 1995 and has today established himself as a character actor.

Early life 
Sharath had an inclination towards cricket and theatre as a child, and "dramatise[d] Bhagat Singh on stage when in school." He "used to read a lot of plays written by people like Kambar" and rated himself as a "fairly good singer too." He accompanied his father Lohithaswa, to his rehearsals for plays, and also took part in "many stage and radio plays before doing amateur theatre in Bengaluru." This led his father Lohithaswa to suggest that Sharath take English-language as his graduation subject. Sharath also obtained a master's degree in English from Bangalore's National College, where he also went on to work as lecturer.

Career 
After a while, "boredom and monotony" led Sharath to quit and taking to acting as a full-time profession starting with stage. He performed in Vasamsi Jirnani, based on a Marathi-language play, and Nanna Thangige Ondu Gandu Kodi among others. His made his film debut playing a bit part in M. S. Sathyu's non-commercial film, and his commercial film debut with Huliya (1996). In an interview to Deccan Herald in 2003, he recalled, "I was offered the role of Huliya for which I was supposed to sport a funny haircut. After that, I could not go into teaching again. The roles that I was offered after Huliya were repetitive. I got fed up. Fortunately or unfortunately, I met with an accident and was forced to off work for at least two to three years. Godhuli came as a major break in my career." He received appreciation for his role as Cheluvanayaka in Chi. Guru Dutt's Godhuli, also fetching him the Aryabhata Award. While he began working in films starting in 1995, it was television that gave him recognition. He appeared in Sathyu's Khayar and Poli Kitty. Work in Kicchu and Chidambara Rahasya led him to become a popular face in Kannada television.

In films, Sharath was cast as Kotwal Ramachandra in Aa Dinagalu (2007), a performance that received praise. R. G. Vijayasarathy of Rediff.com called his performance "wonderful". He received multiple awards for his performance, including the South Filmfare Award for Best Supporting Actor.

Sharath's debut in Tamil films came with Ethir Neechal. He appeared in other Kannada films such as Sanju Weds Geetha (2011) and Bheema Theeradalli (2012). He is known mostly for portrayal of villainous roles in the South Indian films. For his performance in Matthe Satyagraha (2014), he received the Karnataka State Film Award for Best Supporting Actor.

Filmography

Web series

Awards

Karnataka State Film Awards
 2013: Best Supporting Actor: Matthe Satyagraha 
Udaya Sunfeast Awards 
 2008 - Won—Best Villain Award for Aa Dinagalu
Airtel Kasturi Awards 
 2008 - Won—Best Villain Award for Aa Dinagalu
Mysore Minerals' Awards
 2008 - Won—Best Supporting Actor for Aa Dinagalu
Filmfare Awards 
 2008 - Won—Filmfare Award for Best Supporting Actor in Kannada cinema for Aa Dinagalu
 2013 - Nominated—Filmfare Award for Best Supporting Actor - Kannada for Kaddipudi
South Indian International Movie Awards 
 2012: Nominated, Best Actor in a Negative Role – Kannada: Bheema Theeradalli
 2014: Nominated, Best Actor in a Negative Role – Kannada: Ambareesha
Santosham Film Awards
 2012 - Won—Best Supporting Actor - Kannada: Bheema Theeradalli
Bangalore Times Film Awards 2012 
 2012 - Nominated—Best Actor in a Negative Role for Bheema Theeradalli

References

External links
 

1972 births
Living people
Indian male stage actors
Indian male television actors
Kannada people
Male actors in Kannada cinema
Indian male film actors
People from Tumkur
Filmfare Awards South winners
21st-century Indian male actors